Sant Guim de Freixenet is a municipality in the comarca of la Segarra in Catalonia, Spain.

History
Owing to the intense military activity at the Lleida front, this municipality suffered much during the Spanish Civil War (1936–1939).

At that time it was known as Pineda de Segarra and, owing to the hardships caused by the war, paper money was printed in the town.
The present-day main town was formerly known as Sant Guim de l'Estació because it was built around the railway station of the Lleida - Manresa line.

Nowadays many of the villages that make up the  municipality have been depopulated as people have moved to urban areas. Most have only residual population.

Villages
Altadill, 0 
Amorós, 10 
El Castell de Santa Maria, 12 
Freixenet de Segarra, 44 
Melió, 6 
Palamós 0 
La Rabassa, 26 
Sant Domí, 21 
Sant Guim de Freixenet, 868 
Sant Guim de la Rabassa, 22 
La Tallada, 48

References

External links 

Pàgina web de l'ajuntament
 Government data pages 
Dades generals de l'ajuntament

Municipalities in Segarra